Tag League may refer to:

G1 Tag League, a professional wrestling round-robin tag team tournament held annually by New Japan Pro Wrestling
Global Tag League, a professional wrestling round-robin tag team tournament held annually by Pro Wrestling NOAH
Summer Adventure Tag League, a professional wrestling tag team tournament held annually by Dragon Gate
Tag League the Best, a professional wrestling tag team tournament originally held by All Japan Women's Pro-Wrestling and currently by JWP Joshi Puroresu